The 15th Aviation Brigade was a brigade in the Air Force Unit of the Slovenian Armed Forces. The unit operated from 1992 to 2008.

Aircraft Inventory

Military units and formations of Slovenia
Military units and formations established in 1992
Military units and formations disestablished in 2008
Aviation in Slovenia